Live at Martyrs' may refer to:
 Live at Martyrs' (EP), a 2007 EP by The Cat Empire
 ''Live at Martyrs''' (album), a 2000 album by Chris Whitley